Albert Davis Bosson  (November 8, 1853 – April 4, 1926) was a Massachusetts jurist, attorney, and politician who served as the seventeenth Mayor of Chelsea, Massachusetts.

Early life 
Bosson was born in Chelsea, Massachusetts, on November 8, 1853, to George Chapman and Jennie (Hood) Bosson.

Family life 
In 1887 Bosson married Alice Lavinia Campbell the daughter of Charles A. and Lavinia (Hutchinson) Campbell.  They had two children, a son,  Campbell Bosson, born on November 18, 1888, and a daughter, Pauline Arlaud Bosson, born on February 24, 1894.

Judgeship 
In December 1882 Governor John Davis Long appointed Bosson as a Special Justice of the Chelsea Police Court.  In 1892 Bosson was nominated by Governor William E. Russell to be a full Justice of the Chelsea Police Court. Bosson's nomination was approved at a meeting of the Governor's Council in July 1892.

Death 
Bosson died on Easter Sunday, April 4, 1926, in his apartment at the Hotel Sheraton at 91 Bay State Road, in Boston's Back Bay neighborhood.

References

Journal of the American Statistical Association Vol. 22, No. 158 (Jun., 1927), pp. 240–242.

External links
 Mayors of Chelsea 1857 – 1991.

Notes

1853 births
1926 deaths
American bankers
Boston University School of Law alumni
Brown University alumni
Businesspeople from Massachusetts
Massachusetts lawyers
Massachusetts state court judges
Mayors of Chelsea, Massachusetts
Phillips Exeter Academy alumni
Lawyers from Chelsea, Massachusetts
19th-century American lawyers